This article provides a list of divisional boards in the Australian state of Queensland between 1879 and 1903.

When Queensland separated from New South Wales as a colony in its own right in 1859, it inherited New South Wales's local government legislation, the Municipalities Act 1858, which allowed the creation of a municipality with its own elected council to manage local affairs, upon the petition of householders in the area. However, by 1878 only eighteen towns had incorporated in this way. The Government of Queensland passed the Local Government Act 1878, based on Victorian legislation enacted four years earlier, to allow more diverse forms of local government, but this quickly proved unsuitable to Queensland's requirements given its large, sparsely populated areas.

Its response was to enact the Divisional Boards Act 1879 (43 Vic No. 17), which established a new form of local government by dividing all unincorporated parts of Queensland into 74 divisions, and creating for each an elected divisional board which was responsible for a range of services and amenities within its area. Each board had a number of councillors, and a chairman who was appointed from amongst their number. The legislation was amended several times before being replaced by the Divisional Boards Act 1887 (51 Vic No. 7). By 1901, there were 30 municipalities, 6 shires and 120 divisions in Queensland.

In 1902, the Local Authorities Act (2 Edw. VII, No. 19) replaced all divisions with shires and brought them under the same legislation as that which governed the municipalities. This took effect on 31 March 1903.

Divisions created by the Act
On 11 November 1879, 74 divisions came into existence upon the proclamation of the Act:

Divisions created subsequent to the Act

See also
 List of former local government areas of Queensland

References

Queensland, divisional boards
Government of Queensland
Local government in Queensland
Former local government areas of Queensland
Queensland-related lists